The following lists events that happened in 1987 in Libya.

Incumbents
 Prime Minister: Jadallah Azzuz at-Talhi (until 1 March), Umar Mustafa al-Muntasir (starting 1 March)

Events

 End of Chadian–Libyan conflict.
 1987 Libyan Premier League.

 
Years of the 20th century in Libya
Libya
Libya
1980s in Libya